South Dakota Highway 44 (SD 44) is a state highway in southern South Dakota that runs from U.S. Route 385 (US 385) west of Rapid City to Interstate 29 (I-29) south of Sioux Falls.

Route description
SD 44 begins at a junction with US 385 and heads along a curvy road in a general southeasterly direction through the Black Hills National Forest. It curves to the east and leaves the forest, then bends back to the southeast and clips the northeastern corner of the forest before leaving it permanently and entering Rapid City, where it is known as Jackson Boulevard. In the western outskirts of Rapid City, the highway curves to the northeast and passes north of Canyon Lake before crossing Rapid Creek. The road passes near several city parks before turning due north onto Mountain View Road and crossing Main Street, which holds the Interstate 90 Business (I-90 Bus.) designation. A block north of here, SD 44 turns east onto Omaha Street and splits into a four-lane highway. It continues in that direction and intersects the southern terminus of I-190, as well as US 16.

SD 44 and US 16 trek southeast for a short distance before US 16 splits off onto Mt Rushmore Road to the south and SD 44 continues heading southeast along Omaha Street. It crosses the Dakota, Minnesota and Eastern Railroad and then intersects I-90 Bus. again. East of this intersection, SD 44 is reduced to two lanes. It crosses Rapid Creek again, then turns southeast and shares a folded diamond interchange with US 16 Truck and SD 79. Southeast of here, the highway leaves Rapid City and enters unincorporated Rapid Valley. The road parallels a railroad owned by the state of South Dakota as it leaves Rapid Valley and passes just south of the Rapid City Regional Airport.

After departing from the Rapid City area, SD 44 continues southeast and heads through the unincorporated community of Caputa. It crosses Rapid Creek a third and final time, and then curves to the south and crosses the Cheyenne River. South of the river, SD 44 enters Badlands National Park and bends to the east. The road continues east through the hills and plateaus of the Badlands, leaving Pennington County and entering Jackson County in the process. East of the county line, the highway bends to the northeast and enters Interior, where it meets the southern terminus of SD 377. SD 44 then leaves Interior and turns back to the east, and then to the south, leaving Badlands National Park and entering the Pine Ridge Indian Reservation by crossing the White River.

The highway continues due south through the reservation and then turns easterly. It curves to the north and goes through Wanblee before turning back to the east and intersecting SD 73. SD 44 treks east through rolling hills before crossing into Mellette County and leaving the reservation. Just east of the county line, the highway meets SD 63. It continues running east and crosses the Little White River before intersecting US 83 on the western edge of the city of White River, the county seat of Mellette County. The two highways run south for about  before SD 44 splits off to the east.

East of US 83, SD 44 runs southeast through more rolling hills and journeys through Wood. East of Wood, the highway meets SD 53, and it and SD 53 run east, dipping southeast and crossing into Tripp County. In Tripp County, the highways turn south and then back to the east, forming the northern limit of Witten. East of Witten, SD 44 and SD 53 intersect US 183, and the three routes run south for about  before meeting US 18. At this intersection, SD 53 splits to the west, while SD 44 turns east with US 18 and US 183.

The three routes run east toward Winner and enter the city from the northwest. In Winner, SD 44 breaks off from US 18 and US 183 and goes east, leaving the city. The road intersects SD 49 before leaving Tripp County for Gregory County. Just east of the county line lies SD 47, which SD 44 intersects and then heads farther east. The road starts to become more winding and hilly as it nears the Missouri River and Lake Francis Case. It intersects SD 1806 and then curves to the northeast and crosses the river into Charles Mix County.

East of the Missouri River, SD 44 is a much flatter road. It meets SD 50 and heads east concurrent with the route. In Platte, they meet the southern terminus of SD 45. After leaving the city, SD 44 and SD 50 run together until the Douglas county line, where SD 50 turns south while SD 44 continues east into Douglas County.

In Douglas County, SD 44 heads east for about  before it arrives at a junction with US 281 south of Corsica. It and US 281 run concurrent to the east for about  before US 281 curves to the south and leaves SD 44, which runs east for about  before entering Hutchinson County. Then, SD 44 reaches Parkston and intersects SD 37.

East of SD 37, SD 44 continues east, then curves slightly to the north and crosses the James River. East of the river, the highway crosses US 81 about  before crossing into Turner County. In Turner County, SD 44 crosses the BNSF Railway and then the west fork of the Vermillion River. The route enters Parker and crosses the river again, then meets SD 19.

SD 44 and SD 19 run southeast together and leave Parker, then cross the BNSF Railway again. Later, SD 19 continues to run south and SD 44 turns to the east and passes over the east fork of the Vermillion River. Farther to the east, the highway enters Chancellor, where it bends in a southeasterly direction. It continues in this direction until it reaches the Lincoln county line, where it curves farther to the southeast toward Lennox.

The route enters the city and turns to the east toward a junction with the southern terminus SD 17. At the SD 17 intersection, SD 44 turns due south and leaves Lennox. It treks in this direction for about  before turning to the east. The highway runs east through rural Lincoln County for about  before coming to its eastern terminus, a diamond interchange at I-29.

Major intersections

See also

 List of state highways in South Dakota

References

External links

044
Black Hills
Transportation in Rapid City, South Dakota
Transportation in Jackson County, South Dakota
Transportation in Mellette County, South Dakota
Transportation in Tripp County, South Dakota
Transportation in Gregory County, South Dakota
Transportation in Charles Mix County, South Dakota
Transportation in Douglas County, South Dakota
Transportation in Hutchinson County, South Dakota
Transportation in Turner County, South Dakota
Transportation in Lincoln County, South Dakota